Joseph Anthony Fiorenza (January 25, 1931 – September 19, 2022) was an American prelate of the Catholic Church. He was the seventh bishop and the first archbishop of the Archdiocese of Galveston-Houston in Texas, serving from 1985 to 2006. He previously served as bishop of the Diocese of San Angelo in Texas from 1979 to 1984.

Biography

Early life and education 
Joseph Fiorenza was born in Beaumont, Texas, the second of four sons of Anthony and Grace (née Galiano) Fiorenza. His father immigrated from Sicily at age 10, while his mother was the daughter of Sicilian immigrants. He attended St. Anthony High School in Beaumont, where he was football team captain and senior class president. Fiorenza skipped a grade and graduated from high school at age 16 in 1947. He then studied at St. Mary's Seminary in La Porte, Texas.

Priesthood 
Fiorenza was ordained to the priesthood on May 29, 1954. His first assignment was as assistant pastor of Queen of Peace Parish in Houston, where he remained for three years. In 1957, he became professor of medical ethics at Sacred Heart Dominican College and chaplain of St. Joseph Hospital, both in Houston. He served as administrator of Sacred Heart Co-Cathedral in Houston from 1959 to 1967. In 1965, Fiorenza participated in the Selma to Montgomery marches in Alabama during the Civil Rights Movement.

Fiorenza served as pastor of St. Augustine Parish (1967 to 1969) and of St. Benedict the Abbot Parish (1969 to 1972), both in Houston. From 1972 to 1973, he was both pastor of Assumption Parish in Houston and vice-chancellor of the diocese. Fiorenza was named honorary prelate of his holiness by Pope Paul VI on December 5, 1973, and served as diocesan chancellor from 1973 to 1979.

Bishop of San Angelo 
On September 4, 1979, Fiorenza was appointed the fourth bishop of the Diocese of San Angelo by Pope John Paul II. He received his episcopal consecration on  October 25, 1979, from Archbishop Patrick Flores, with Bishops John Morkovsky and John E. McCarthy serving as co-consecrators, at Sacred Heart Cathedral in San Angelo.

Bishop and archbishop of Galveston-Houston 
On December 18, 1984, Fiorenza was named bishop of the Diocese of Galveston-Houston by Pope John Paul II.  He was installed by Archbishop Patrick Flores in the presence of Archbishop Pio Laghi, the apostolic pro-nuncio.  The Diocese of Galveston-Houston was elevated to the level of archdiocese by John Paul II on Dec. 29, 2004, at which point Fiorenza became an archbishop.

On June 11, 2001, Fiorenza expressed his regret at the execution of Timothy McVeigh, a domestic terrorist convicted of killing 168 people in the Oklahoma City bombing in 1995.  Fiorenza said:In an age where respect for life is threatened in so many ways, we believe it is important to emphasize that human life is a gift from God, and no one or any government should presume to kill God's gift.When a wave of allegations of sexual abuse of boys and girls within the Catholic Church was widely reported from 2002, Fiorenza issued a statement proclaiming that the archdiocese would "make the protection and safety of children and young people a top priority", but it has been reported that nothing was done; internal memos from 1996—published in detail by the press—show that abuse was reported but ignored for years. In a 2006 news report Fiorenza was said to have had a tendency to accept troubled clergy into his domains; and the Galveston-Houston archdiocese acted to protect the church from public scrutiny, mounting vigorous legal defenses, blaming the victims, and obfuscating for the news media.

Retirement 
Fiorenza submitted his letter of retirement as archbishop of the Archdiocese of Galveston-Houston to Pope Benedict XVI in February 2006 at the mandatory retirement age of 75.  The pope accepted his resignation on February 28, 2006, and appointed  former coadjutor archbishop Daniel DiNardo as Fiorenza's successor. Fiorenza has been living in retirement at the Archbishop Joseph A. Fiorenza Priest Retirement Residence in Houston. The Archbishop Joseph Fiorenza Park in Harris County, Texas, is named after Fiorenza.

In a February 2020 lawsuit filed against the archdiocese, a man and a woman from Conroe, Texas accused Fiorenza of allowing the ordination of Manuel La Rosa-Lopez, despite a previous allegation of sexual abuse. In 1992, the Diocese of Galveston-Houston received an accusation that La Rosa-Lopez had molested a minor at St. Thomas More Parish in Houston.  Despite this, Fiorenza allowed La Rosa-Lopez to be ordained a priest in 1999.  Between 1998 and 2001, he allegedly molested the two plaintiffs at Sacred Heart Parish in Conroe, both of whom were children.  Fiorenza met with the girl's family at the time of the initial accusation and promised to remove La Rosa-Lopez from the parish and send him for treatment.  However, the allegations were never reported to police or to parishioners.  In December 2020, LaRosa-Lopez pleaded guilty to felony indecency with a child and was sentenced to 10 years in prison.

Appointments and board memberships
Member of the administrative board of the National Conference of Catholic Bishops, 1995– ?
Former member of the Bishops' Committee for Black Catholics
Vice-president of the National Conference of Catholic Bishops – 1995–1998
Board member of the Catholic Near East Welfare Association
Trustee of the University of St. Thomas in Houston
President of the board of trustees of Catholic Charities
President of the National Conference of Catholic Bishops – 1998–2001

See also
 

 Catholic Church hierarchy
 Catholic Church in the United States
 Historical list of the Catholic bishops of the United States
 List of Catholic bishops of the United States
 Lists of patriarchs, archbishops, and bishops
 Christianity in Houston

References

External links

 Fiorenza, Archbishop Joseph and David Goldstein. Archbishop Joseph Fiorenza Oral History, Houston Oral History Project, May 27, 2008.
Roman Catholic Archdiocese of Galveston–Houston

Episcopal succession

1931 births
2022 deaths
People from Beaumont, Texas
21st-century Roman Catholic archbishops in the United States
Roman Catholic archbishops of Galveston–Houston
20th-century Roman Catholic bishops in the United States
Bishops appointed by Pope John Paul II